Las or LAS may stand for:

Places
 Las (Greece), an ancient city in Greece
 Las, Gliwice County, a village in Silesian Voivodeship, southern Poland
 Las, Lublin Voivodeship, a village in eastern Poland
 Las, Silesian Voivodeship, a village in southern Poland
 Las, Warsaw, a subdistrict of Wawer in south-east Warsaw
 Łaś, Masovian Voivodeship (east-central Poland)
 Las Khorey, a town in Somaliland

Brands and enterprises
 Líneas Aéreas Suramericanas, an airline in Bogotá, Colombia
 Lucasfilm Animation Singapore

Governments and organizations
 League of Arab States, in and around North Africa
 Lithuanian Academy of Sciences
 Liverpool Astronomical Society, United Kingdom 
 London Ambulance Service, United Kingdom
 Louisville Astronomical Society, United States

Schools
 Lahore American School, Pakistan
 Leysin American School, a boarding school in Switzerland
 Little Angels' School, Nepal

Science and technology
 LAS file format, designed for the interchange and archiving of lidar point cloud data
 Linear alkylbenzene sulfonate, a common class of surfactants
 Log ASCII Standard, computer file format in the petroleum industry
 Lung allocation score, US, for prioritising lung transplants
 Launch abort system

Transport
 Harry Reid International Airport, serving Las Vegas, Nevada, US (IATA code LAS)
 Llansamlet railway station, Swansea, Wales (National Rail station code LAS)

Other uses
 Los Angeles Sparks, Women's National Basketball Association team from Los Angeles, California
 Louise Aslanian, a prominent figure in the French Resistance with the pseudonym "Las"
 Lås, an archaic Norwegian unit of length
 The La's, English pop band
 Latin American Spanish, an umbrella term for the Spanish language in the Americas
 Latin American studies, an academic and research field